The 1992 McNeese State Cowboys football team was an American football team that represented McNeese State University as a member of the Southland Conference (Southland) during the 1992 NCAA Division I-AA football season. In their third year under head coach Bobby Keasler, the team compiled an overall record of 9–4, with a mark of 6–1 in conference play, and finished second in the Southland. The Cowboys advanced to the Division I-AA playoffs and lost to Northern Iowa in the quarterfinals.

Schedule

References

McNeese State
McNeese Cowboys football seasons
McNeese State Cowboys football